The County of Sturt is one of the 49 cadastral counties of South Australia. It was proclaimed by Governor George Grey in 1842 and named for early Australian explorer, Charles Sturt. It stretches from the Bremer River and eastern slopes of the Adelaide Hills at Nairne and Tungkillo to the Murray River in the east and in the south, the portion of Lake Alexandrina north of a line from Point Sturt to Pomanda Island. This includes the west-of-river parts of the contemporary local government areas of the Mid Murray Council and Murray Bridge City.

Hundreds 
The County of Sturt is divided into the following hundreds:
 Hundred of Angas (Cambrai)
 Hundred of Brinkley (Brinkley, Wellington)
 Hundred of Finniss (Mannum)
 Hundred of Freeling (Tolderol)
 Hundred of Jutland (Springton, Eden Valley)
 Hundred of Kanmantoo (Nairne, Callington)
 Hundred of Mobilong (Murray Bridge)
 Hundred of Monarto (Monarto)
 Hundred of Ridley (Wongulla)
 Hundred of Tungkillo (Tungkillo)

See also
 Lands administrative divisions of South Australia

References

Sturt